Narasimha III (r. 12631292). During his rule over the Hoysala Empire, internal feud between the king and his brother Ramanatha ruling from Kannanur came to the forefront. He also had to face invasions from the Seuna who attacked his regal capital Halebidu. However, Narasimha III was able to inflict defeat on these incursions and safeguard his kingdom. He was succeeded by his notable son Veera Ballala III.

Biography
Narasimha III ruled from 1263 to 1292. During his rule over the Hoysala Empire, internal feud between the king and his brother Ramanatha ruling from Kannanur came to the forefront. He also had to face invasions from the Seuna who attacked his regal capital Halebidu. However, Narasimha III was able to inflict defeat on these incursions and safeguard his kingdom. He was succeeded by his notable son Veera Ballala III.

He worshiped Parshvanatha, the 23rd Jain tirthankara, and his spiritual adviser was Maghanandi Siddhanta (Digambara monk of Balatkara Gana).

References

Sources
 
 
 Dr. Suryanath U. Kamat, A Concise history of Karnataka from pre-historic times to the present, Jupiter books, MCC, Bangalore, 2001 (Reprinted 2002) OCLC: 7796041

1292 deaths
Hoysala kings
Hindu monarchs
Year of birth unknown
13th-century Indian monarchs
13th-century Hindus